States Marine Lines was the  passenger and cargo of the States Marine Corporation founded by Henry Mercer in 1930 in New York City. In 1931 Cornelius S. Walsh became an investor and the company Secretary.  At the started by chartering foreign ships to run the lines in tramp trade. Later scheduled cargo services was added to the line. In 1934 States Marine started monthly cargo routes to South Africa.
 
In 1937 States Marine charted the SS Carrollton a 1903, 1,732 tons from, acquired by Saginaw Dock and Terminal Company of Cleveland, Ohio. In 1940 States Marine Lines purchased the SS Lone Star a 1919, 5,101 tons cargo ship from Mississippi Shipping Company of New Orleans and the SS Wolverine, 1919, 4,990 tons, cargo ship from Export Steamship Company in New York City. In 1941 States Marine Lines charted the SS Atlantic Trader, 1918, 2,241 tons, a cargo ship from Saginaw Dock and Terminal Company of Cleveland. In 1941 States Marine Lines charted the SS Green Mountain, a 1919, 4,988 tons, a cargo ship from Federal Marine Corp. of New York. In 1941 States Marine Lines charted the SS Hoosier, 1920, a 5,060 tons cargo ship from Hoosier Marine Corp. of New York. In 1941 States Marine Lines charted the SS Keystone, 1919, a 5,565 tons, cargo ship from Shepard Steamship Company of Boston, MA.

On 10 July 1942 SS Hoosier was sunk by Uboat U-376 after departing Archangel, USSR.  On March 13, 1943, the SS Keystone sunk by U-172 after her engine failed in convoy UGS-6 from New York to North Africa.

During World War II the States Marine Lines was active with charter shipping with the Maritime Commission and War Shipping Administration. During wartime, the Mississippi Shipping Company operated Victory ships, Liberty shipss, and a few Empire ships.

World War II

SS Benjamin Hawkins
War World II Victory ships:
 SS Mercer Victory
 SS Morgantown Victory
 SS Westerly Victory
SS Hugh J. Kilpatrick
World War II 1920 ships:
Chipana, 1920, 3,280 tons, from Grace Steamship Lines of New York.
Curaca, 1920, 3,280 tons, from New Orleans and South American Steamship Company.

Post World War II

After War World II there were many low-cost ships for sales, States Marine Lines was now able to own more ships than charter. States Marine Lines continued to charter both U.S. and foreign ships.

States Marine Lines purchased from the U.S. Maritime Commission Type C2 ships:
 SS Cotton State, C2, 1946, 6,103 tons
 SS Empire State, C2, 1945, 6,214 tons
 SS Garden State, C2, 1946, 6,103 
 SS Golden State, C2, 1946, 6,103 tons
 SS Hoosier State, EC2, 1944, 7,280 tons
 SS Keystone State, EC2, 1944, 7,210 tons
 SS Magnolia State, C2, 1946, 6,103 tons
 SS Old Dominion State, EC2, 1944, 7,210 tons
 SS Palmetto State, EC2, 1945, 7,207 tons
 SS Volunteer State, EC2, 1944, 7,216 tons
 SS Constitution State, 1943

In 1947 States Marine Lines sold off Atlantic Trader, Green Mountain, Wolverine, Blue Grass State, Evergreen State, Lone Star State, Peach Tree State. In 1947 States Marine purchased controlling interest in the South African Marine Corp., also called Safmarine.

Korean War
States Marine Lines served as Merchant Marine Naval shipping company, supplying goods for the Korean War. Ships made trips to and from Korea. About 75 percent of the personnel taken to Korea for the Korean War came by the Merchant Marine Ships. States Marine Lines transported goods, mail, food and other supplies. About 90 percent of the cargo was moved by Merchant Marine Naval to the Korea War  Zone. States Marine Lines made trips between the US and Korea helping American forces engaged against Communist aggression in South Korea. After the war most ships were put into the National Defense Reserve Fleet.

United States Merchant Marine ships:
SS Alamo Victory 
SS Brigham Victory
SS Beatrice Victory
SS Earlham Victory
SS Grove City Victory
SS Kenyon Victory
SS Loma Victory
SS Oberlin Victory
SS Occidental Victory
SS Ouachita Victory
SS Sharon Victory
SS Twin Falls Victory
SS Wesleyan Victory

Post Korean
In 1954 States Marine took over management of Bloomfield Steamship Company in Houston, Texas, which was closed in 1969. Bloomfield was founded on post World War II low-cost ships by Ben M. Bloomfield. In 1954 Old Dominion State and Wolverine State are sold off.

In 1955 States Marine purchased four 1945, 10,780 tons Type C4-class ships from the Joshua Hendy Corp. Second Hoosier State, Second Keystone State, Second Wolverine State, and the second Lone Star State. In 1957 States Marine purchased four 1945 Victory ships ewach former line ship names Cotton State, Magnolia State, Palmetto State, and 
Volunteer State. States Marine also took on charters for the: Alma Victory, Beloit Victory, Binghampton Victory, Britain Victory, Clovis Victory, Creighton Victory, Iran Victory, Knox Victory Clovis Victory, Rock Springs Victory and Simmons Victory. In 1960 States Marine purchased: 7,868 tons C2 ships: SSBadger State, Bay State, Bayou State, Evergreen State, Blue Grass State, and Buckeye State,, (2), C3, 1943, 7,868 tons. Also Type C3: Copper State, SS Aloha State, and Gopher State, SS Steel Director''

Nuclear-powered cargo ship
In 1962 States Marine took over management of the first nuclear-powered cargo ship, NS Savannah. Built in 1958 at 13,559 tons, States Marine managed the ship for the U.S. Department of Commerce for one year.

Vietnam War
For the Vietnam War States Marine operated the charter for the SS Gainesville Victory.  Also, in 1965 Henry Mercer purchased Cornelius Walsh shares in the company and purchase the Waterman Steamship Corporation. States Marine also supported the Vietnam War with line owned ships and ships charter.

States Marine failed to upgrade to container ships and modernize as other shipping lines did in the 1970s and with the Vietnam War over States Marine closed in 1974, all ships being sold or scrapped due to age.

See also
Moragne v. States Marine Lines, Inc.

References

Defunct shipping companies of the United States
Transport companies established in 1930
1930 establishments in New York (state)